Valve Raudnask (née Valve Purask; born 10 December 1936 in Aleksandri Parish, Võru County) is an Estonian journalist and politician. From 1963 until 1982, she worked as a journalist for the daily newspaper Noorte Hääl. From 1982 until 1983, she was a journalist for Õhtuleht. Later, from 1983 until 1994, she was the head of the newspaper Rahva Hääl, and from 1994 until 1995, the head of Eesti Sõnumid. She was a member of VIII Riigikogu, representing the Estonian Centre Party.

Noorte Hääl

References

Living people
1936 births
Estonian women journalists
Members of the Riigikogu, 1995–1999
Estonian Centre Party politicians
Women members of the Riigikogu
Recipients of the Order of the White Star, 5th Class
University of Tartu alumni
People from Põlva Parish